Agum II (also known as Agum Kakrime) was possibly a Kassite ruler who may have become the 8th or more likely the 9th king of the third Babylonian dynasty sometime after Babylonia was defeated and sacked by the Hittite king Mursilis I in 1595 BC (middle chronology), establishing the Kassite Dynasty which was to last in Babylon until 1155 BC. A later tradition, the Marduk Prophecy, gives 24 years after a statue was taken, before it returned of its own accord to Babylon, suggesting a Kassite occupation beginning around 1507 BC.

The only historical source describes him as son of Urzigurumaš, the 6th king of the dynasty, but the Synchronistic King List has two lacunae where the 8th and 9th kings precede Burna-Buriaš I, who was the 10th. The 7th position is occupied by a name containing “Ḫarba.” It has been suggested that the 9th position may show traces of the name “Kakrime”, purported to mean Sword of Mercy or Weapon of Thunder.

Agum-Kakrime Inscription

Everything that is known about him is through the Agum-Kakrime Inscription, an Akkadian text written in the neo-Assyrian cuneiform script but in very short lines in imitation of an antiquarian style. It is extant in two copies, which describe the King's recovery of the cultic Statue of Marduk from the land of Ḫana (KUR ḫa-ni-i), pilfered by the Hittites during their sack of Babylon, and its restoration in the newly refurbished temple of Ésagila. In it, Agum portrays himself as the legitimate ruler and caring “shepherd” of both the Kassites and the Akkadians. He asserts his suzerainty over Padan and Alman and also the Guteans, “a foolish people,” groups variously located in regions of the Zagros mountains.

The inscription begins with an introduction, giving the King's name, genealogy, epithets and so on. He is a descendant of Abi[rattash], “the fierce hero.” It continues with a long narrative of the return of Marduk and his consort Zarpanītum and then lists Agum-Kakrime's many generous donations to the temple and includes descriptions of the purification of the house itself by a snake charmer and the construction of protective demons for the doorway.

Of uncertain provenance, it is on two tablets, one of which covers 8 columns and more than 350 lines, and including much esoteric detail concerning the temple and its rituals. One was found in the library of Ashurbanipal, purporting to be a copy of an inscription made in antiquity while the other was found elsewhere in Kouyunjik, ancient Nineveh. The Library of Ashurbanipal copy contains two colophons, and apart from the standard library identification, the earlier one reads mudû mudâ likallim, which has been translated as “Let the learned instruct the learned” or alternatively “The initiate may show the initiate.” For those disputing its authenticity, it is a later pseudonymous propaganda piece for the cult of Marduk, emphasizing certain tax exemptions granted for the restoration of the statues. Kassite era royal inscriptions are usually inscribed in Sumerian. Those supportive of its authenticity cite the iconography of the demons described on the door of the cella, which represent Marduk's defeated foes, the gods of cities conquered by Babylon, such as Ešnunna and are illustrative of a middle Babylonian theology. Marduk has yet to attain sovereignty over the universe characterized by the Enûma Eliš and the struggle with Tiāmat.

Primary publications

  pl. 38, no. 2 (line art), K.4149 misidentified as a tablet of Ashur-bani-pal; titles and prayers.
  pl. 33 line art for tablets K.4149+4203+4348+Sm 27
  full text.
  pl. 36 tablet Rm 505 (the duplicate copy).
  no. 4.
 
  full text.
  translation only.
  transliteration, translation and photographs

Inscriptions

Notes

References

16th-century BC Babylonian kings
Kassite kings